The Guerrilla (Spanish:La guerrilla) is a 1973 French-Spanish film directed by Rafael Gil and starring Francisco Rabal, Jacques Destoop and Julia Saly.

Cast

References

Bibliography 
 Bentley, Bernard. A Companion to Spanish Cinema. Boydell & Brewer 2008.

External links 
 

1973 films
French war drama films
Spanish war drama films
1970s Spanish-language films
Films directed by Rafael Gil
Peninsular War films
Films set in the 1810s
Films set in Spain
Films with screenplays by Rafael J. Salvia
Guerrilla warfare in film
1970s Spanish films